The Society for Philosophy and Psychology (SPP) is a professional organization in North America that promotes discussion and research at the intersection of philosophy, psychology and cognitive science. Its stated purpose is "to promote interaction between philosophers, psychologists and other cognitive scientists on issues of common concern." To this end, it organizes an annual conference, maintains a listserve, and awards research prizes.

History
The first meeting was held at MIT in 1974 and Jerry Fodor was nominated first president of the society, though it was not until the 1976 meeting that a constitution was adopted and officers were elected. The first joint meeting with its European counterpart, the European Society for Philosophy and Psychology (ESPP) was held in Barcelona in 2004, with subsequent joint meetings in 2011 (Montreal) and 2022 (Milan).

Stanton Prize
The SPP annually awards the Stanton Prize to a young active member of the society who has made a significant contribution to interdisciplinary research. Recipients of the award include:
2001, Kathleen Akins, Simon Frasier University
2002, Paul Bloom, Yale University
2003, Jesse Prinz, University of North Carolina at Chapel Hill
2004, David Chalmers, Australian National University
2005, Shaun Nichols, University of Arizona
2006, Fei Xu, University of British Columbia
2007, John Doris, Washington University in St. Louis
2008, Laurie Santos, Yale University
2009, Joshua Knobe, Yale University
2010, Tania Lombrozo, University of California, Berkeley
2011, Adina Roskies, Dartmouth College
2012, Joshua Greene, Harvard University
2013, Edouard Machery, University of Pittsburgh
2014, Fiery Cushman, Brown University
2015, Sarah-Jane Leslie, Princeton University
2016, Liane Young, Boston College
2017, Felipe De Brigard, Duke University
2018, Kiley Hamlin, University of British Columbia
2019, Chandra Sripada, University of Michigan
2020, Marjorie Rhodes, New York University
2021, Jonathan Phillips, Dartmouth College
2022, Chaz Firestone, Johns Hopkins University

References

External links
 Official Site

Psychology organizations based in the United States
Philosophical societies in the United States
Cognitive science organizations